Anton Kazantsev (born August 26, 1986) is a Kazakhstani professional ice hockey defenceman. He is currently playing with the Yermak Angarsk of the Supreme Hockey League (VHL). Kazantsev previously played for Barys Astana of the Kontinental Hockey League (KHL).

International
He participated at the 2010 IIHF World Championship as a member of the Kazakhstan men's national ice hockey team.

Kazantsev was named to the Kazakhstan men's national ice hockey team for competition at the 2014 IIHF World Championship.

Career statistics

References

External links

Living people
Barys Nur-Sultan players
Kazakhstani ice hockey defencemen
Kazakhstani people of Russian descent
Saryarka Karagandy players
1986 births
Asian Games gold medalists for Kazakhstan
Medalists at the 2017 Asian Winter Games
Asian Games medalists in ice hockey
Ice hockey players at the 2017 Asian Winter Games
People from Kostanay Region